At the 2004 South Asian Games, the athletics events were held at the Jinnah Stadium in Islamabad, Pakistan from 2 April to 6 April 2004. A total of 32 events were contested, of which 19 by male and 13 by female athletes. A total of six Games records were set over the course of the five-day competition.

India topped the medal rankings with 15 golds and 29 medals to their name – an Indian athlete reached the podium in all the women's events. Sri Lanka were second best, followed by the hosts Pakistan. Madhuri Singh scored an 800/1500 metres double gold medal in the women's events. Sri Lanka's Rohan Pradeep Kumara made an impact on the men's side by winning the 200 and 400 metres events, as well as helping the Sri Lanka 4×400 m relay team to another gold.

Records

Medal summary

Men

Women

Medal table

References
General
South Asian (Federation) Games. GBR Athletics. Retrieved on 2010-03-04.
Weerawansa, Dinesh (2004-04-02). South Asian Games - Day One. IAAF. Retrieved on 2010-03-04.
Weerawansa, Dinesh (2004-04-03). Jayasinghe takes 200m - South Asian Games - Day Two. IAAF. Retrieved on 2010-03-04.
Weerawansa, Dinesh (2004-04-04). Cooray wins men’s Marathon - 2:16:38 - South Asian Games, Day 3. IAAF. Retrieved on 2010-03-04.
Weerawansa, Dinesh (2004-04-05). India upsets Sri Lanka in men's 100m final - South Asian Games - Day Four. IAAF. Retrieved on 2010-03-04.
Weerawansa, Dinesh (2004-04-06). Third gold for Kumar - South Asian Games - Final Day. IAAF. Retrieved on 2010-03-04.
Specific

External links

2004 South Asian Games
2004 South Asian Games
South Asian Games